In probability theory, Hoeffding's inequality provides an upper bound on the probability that the sum of bounded independent random variables deviates from its expected value by more than a certain amount. Hoeffding's inequality was proven by Wassily Hoeffding in 1963.

Hoeffding's inequality is a special case of the Azuma–Hoeffding inequality and McDiarmid's inequality. It is similar to the Chernoff bound, but tends to be less sharp, in particular when the variance of the random variables is small. It is similar to, but incomparable with, one of Bernstein's inequalities.

Statement 
Let  be independent random variables such that  almost surely. Consider the sum of these random variables,

Then Hoeffding's theorem states that, for all ,

Note that the inequalities also hold when the  have been obtained using sampling without replacement; in this case the random variables are not independent anymore. A proof of this statement can be found in Hoeffding's paper.

Example 

This can occur when Xi are independent Bernoulli random variables, though they need not be identically distributed. Then we get the inequality

for all . This is a version of the additive Chernoff bound which is more general, since it allows for random variables that take values between zero and one, but also weaker, since the Chernoff bound gives a better tail bound when the random variables have small variance.

General case of sub-Gaussian random variables 

The proof of Hoeffding's inequality can be generalized to any sub-Gaussian distribution. In fact, the main lemma used in the proof, Hoeffding's lemma, implies that bounded random variables are sub-Gaussian. A random variable  is called sub-Gaussian, if 

for some c>0. For a random variable , the following norm is finite if and only if  is sub-Gaussian:

Then let  be zero-mean independent sub-Gaussian random variables, the general version of the Hoeffding's inequality states that:

where c > 0 is an absolute constant.

Proof 
The proof of Hoeffding's inequality follows similarly to concentration inequalities like Chernoff bounds. The main difference is the use of Hoeffding's Lemma:

Suppose  is a real random variable such that  almost surely. Then

Using this lemma, we can prove Hoeffding's inequality. As in the theorem statement, suppose  are  independent random variables such that  almost surely for all i, and let .

This upper bound is the best for the value of  minimizing the value inside the exponential. This can be done easily by optimizing a quadratic, giving

Usage

Confidence intervals

Hoeffding's inequality can be used to derive confidence intervals. We consider a coin that shows heads with probability  and tails with probability . We toss the coin  times, generating  samples  (which are i.i.d Bernoulli random variables). Furthermore, the probability that the coin comes up heads at least  times can be exactly quantified by the following expression:

where  is the number of heads in  coin tosses.

Since this bound holds on both sides of the mean, Hoeffding's inequality implies that the number of heads that we see is concentrated around its mean, with exponentially small tail.

Solving the above for  gives us the following:

Therefore, we require at least  samples to acquire a -confidence interval .

Hence, the cost of acquiring the confidence interval is sublinear in terms of confidence level and quadratic in terms of precision. Note that there are more efficient methods of estimating a confidence interval.

See also
Concentration inequality – a summary of tail-bounds on random variables.
Hoeffding's lemma
Bernstein inequalities (probability theory)

Notes

References

 
 
 
 
   .
  

Probabilistic inequalities